Yevgeni Dmitriyevich Stukanov (born 9 January 1996) is a Russian football midfielder.

Club career
He made his debut in the Russian Second Division for FC SKVO Rostov-on-Don on 12 July 2013, in a game against FC Torpedo Armavir.

He played his first game for the main squad of FC Rostov on 24 September 2015, in a Russian Cup game against FC Tosno.

Career statistics

Club

References

External links
 

1996 births
Sportspeople from Volgograd
Living people
Russian footballers
Association football midfielders
FC SKA Rostov-on-Don players
FC Rostov players
FC Rotor Volgograd players
FC Dynamo Stavropol players
FC Urozhay Krasnodar players
FC Nizhny Novgorod (2015) players
FC Ararat Moscow players
FC Inter Cherkessk players
FC Mashuk-KMV Pyatigorsk players